Montezuma is a city in Poweshiek County, Iowa, United States. The population was 1,442 at the time of the 2020 census. It is the county seat of Poweshiek County.

Geography
Montezuma's longitude and latitude coordinates in decimal form are 41.584737, -92.525258.

History

Montezuma was first established in 1848, when local veterans of the Mexican–American War named the city after Monteuczomah, the last Aztec emperor of Mexico. Once a hub of regional railroad transport, Montezuma has continued to evolve and grow in a variety of ways. Montezuma was also a major stop on the stagecoach line between Iowa City and Des Moines on the original Diamond Trail.

Located on the southwest corner of Montezuma's square is the Poweshiek County Historical and Genealogical Society, located in the historic Carnegie library. Housed in the former Poweshiek County Jail is the Poweshiek County History Museum.

The Scott Township School No. 7, also known as the Fitzsimmons School was moved from the original country landscape to the campus of the Poweshiek County Historical Society.

Demographics

2010 census
As of the census of 2010, there were 1,462 people, 632 households, and 399 families living in the city. The racial makeup of the city was 98.2% White, 0.4% African American, 0.3% Native American, 0.1% Asian, 0.3% from other races, and 0.8% from two or more races. Hispanic or Latino of any race were 1.4% of the population.

There were 632 households, of which 29.4% had children under the age of 18 living with them, 48.4% were married couples living together, 10.0% had a female householder with no husband present, 4.7% had a male householder with no wife present, and 36.9% were non-families. 32.0% of all households were made up of individuals, and 14.9% had someone living alone who was 65 years of age or older. The average household size was 2.26 and the average family size was 2.83.

The median age in the city was 42.5 years. 23.5% of residents were under the age of 18; 7.3% were between the ages of 18 and 24; 23% were from 25 to 44; 26.4% were from 45 to 64; and 19.8% were 65 years of age or older. The gender makeup of the city was 47.4% male and 52.6% female.

2000 census
As of the census of 2000, there were 1,440 people, 601 households, and 390 families living in the city. The racial makeup of the city was 98.75% White, 0.28% African American, 0.07% Native American, 0.35% Asian, and 0.56% from two or more races. Hispanic or Latino of any race were 0.42% of the population.

There were 601 households, out of which 28.3% had children under the age of 18 living with them, 53.7% were married couples living together, 7.8% had a female householder with no husband present, and 35.1% were non-families. 31.1% of all households were made up of individuals, and 16.1% had someone living alone who was 65 years of age or older. The average household size was 2.31 and the average family size was 2.91.

23.6% were under the age of 18, 8.9% from 18 to 24, 24.3% from 25 to 44, 20.8% from 45 to 64, and 22.4% were 65 years of age or older. The median age was 40 years. For every 100 females, there were 91.0 males. For every 100 females age 18 and over, there were 83.9 males.

The median income for a household in the city was $35,820, and the median income for a family was $43,083. Males had a median income of $31,483 versus $21,450 for females. The per capita income for the city was $17,806. About 3.8% of families and 6.4% of the population were below the poverty line, including 7.8% of those under age 18 and 5.8% of those age 65 or over.

Education
Montezuma is home to the Montezuma Community School District, a K-12 school district. The mascots are the Braves and Bravettes and the school colors are blue and white.

Girls State Basketball Champions: 1969, 1970

Boys State Basketball Champions: 1971, 1990, 2021

Attractions
Montezuma's agricultural heritage is celebrated in barn quilt art and renewed interest in local preservation has inspired many to continue living out that history. Montezuma is the inaugural home to the first town square Bill of Rights monument in the United States.

Poweshiek County Freedom Rock

Freedom Rock painter Raymond “Bubba” Sorensen II of Greenfield finished the Poweshiek County Freedom Rock in 2016, and is located on the southeast corner of the courthouse square.

Recreational and Residential Lakes

The development of Diamond Lake, Lake Ponderosa, and Lake Silverado add to the scenic beauty and recreational opportunities of the area. Green spaces and wildlife areas like Fox Forest offer hiking and equestrian trails, as well as observation of native vegetation and wildflowers. Nearby Fleming Woods State Preserve offers sanctuary to many species of other indigenous plant life and animals. It is believed that Chief Poweshiek and other Native Americans once lived in these areas.

Churches and denominations 
Montezuma is home to several churches ready to meet individual and family needs in the areas of spiritual growth, worship, Biblical worldview, and Christian fellowship. 

Community Hope Assembly of God

First Evangelical Presbyterian

United Methodist Church

Jackson Church of Christ

Faith Christian Center

West Liberty Church

Each congregation offers Sunday and mid-week services as well as weekly Bible study groups, children's education programs, youth group activities, and missions work opportunities.

Infrastructure

Transportation
Montezuma is located approximately 8 miles south of the exit 191 on Interstate 80 on U.S. Route 63. The city is also serviced by Iowa Highway 85 and county road F57.

Healthcare
Montezuma residents have access to UnityPoint Health - Grinnell Montezuma Medical Clinic, located at 101 West Washington. When hospitalization is required the closest and most convenient hospital for residents is Grinnell Regional Medical Center, located at 210 4th Avenue in Grinnell, Iowa.

Notable people

Robin Brown (born 1961) teacher and member of the Minnesota House of Representatives
Pete Brownell (American businessman) (born 1969) is the CEO of Brownells, founded by his grandfather, in Montezuma, Iowa. He served as the president of National Rifle Association from May 2017 to May 2018.
Thomas Jefferson Cowie (1857–1936) Rear admiral in the United States Navy with the destroyer  named in his honor.
Marsena E. Cutts (1833–1883) teacher, lawyer, and politician serving in both the Iowa House and Senate and the U.S. House.
Dan Johnston (1938-2016), Iowa lawyer and state legislator
Thomas Harris MacDonald (1881–1957) highway advocate and bureaucrat, chief of the Iowa State Highway Commission and both chief and commissioner of the Bureau of Public Roads.

See also

10th Iowa Volunteer Infantry Regiment was an infantry regiment that served in the Union Army during the American Civil War.
Poweshiek County Courthouse
Central Iowa Railway

References

External links

City of Montezuma Portal style website, Government, Businesses, Recreation and more
City-Data Comprehensive Statistical Data and more about Montezuma

Cities in Iowa
County seats in Iowa
Cities in Poweshiek County, Iowa